Lempster Mountain Wind Power Project is a 24-megawatt wind farm, opened in 2008 in Lempster, New Hampshire in the northeast United States. Owned by Iberdrola, it is the first major wind-power installation in the state of New Hampshire.

Located 5 miles from Mount Sunapee, it has 12 wind turbines stretching over several connected ridgelines.

References

External links 

 Lempster Wind information from Iberdrola

Energy infrastructure completed in 2008
Buildings and structures in Sullivan County, New Hampshire
Wind farms in New Hampshire
Lempster, New Hampshire
2008 establishments in New Hampshire